Aouf Abdul Rahman Youssef (born 24 November 1960) is an Iraqi sprinter. He competed in the men's 200 metres at the 1988 Summer Olympics.

References

1960 births
Living people
Athletes (track and field) at the 1988 Summer Olympics
Iraqi male sprinters
Olympic athletes of Iraq
Place of birth missing (living people)
Asian Games medalists in athletics (track and field)
Asian Games silver medalists for Iraq
Athletes (track and field) at the 1982 Asian Games
Athletes (track and field) at the 1986 Asian Games
Medalists at the 1982 Asian Games
Medalists at the 1986 Asian Games